Georgitsis is a surname. Notable people with the surname include: 

Phaedon Georgitsis (1939–2019), Greek actor
Platon Georgitsis, Greek sports shooter

Greek-language surnames